Samuel Iling-Junior (born 4 October 2003) is an English professional footballer who plays as a winger for  club Juventus.

A youth product of Chelsea and Juventus, Iling-Junior made his debut for reserve team Juventus U23 in the 2021–22 season, while also reaching the UEFA Youth League semi-finals with the U19 squad. In the following campaign, Iling-Junior started with Juventus Next Gen, scoring four goals in seven matches, and then was promoted to the first team in December 2022, after making his debut both in Serie A and Champions League.

Iling-Junior has represented England at various youth international levels, having won a UEFA European Under-19 Championship in 2022.

Club career

Early career 
Born in Islington, London, Iling-Junior joined Chelsea academy in 2011 at the age of eight, and spent nine years with the club. He was promoted to the under-19s aged 16. In 2020, he decided to leave Chelsea, rejecting an athletic scholarship deal, attracting the interest from clubs such as Paris Saint-Germain, Bayern Munich, Borussia Dortmund and Juventus; he signed a three-year contract with the latter in September of that year.

Juventus

2020–2022 
On 7 October 2020, Iling-Junior was included in The Guardian's list of the 60 best talents in the world born in 2003. On 2 April 2021, he was first called up by Juventus U23 alongside his U19 teammate Gabriele Mulazzi for a Serie C match against Alessandria. He finished the 2020–21 season with four goals and seven assists in 28 matches for the under-19 team.

On 22 August, he made his debut for Juventus U23 in a 3–2 win against Pro Sesto in the Coppa Italia Serie C. His Serie C debut came on 3 October, replacing Nikola Sekulov in the second half against Mantova. Iling-Junior was first called up to the first team on 21 May 2022, for a match against Fiorentina.

In the 2021–22 season, he improved his stats, having played 36 matches and scored 13 goals. Iling-Junior also helped the U19s reach the UEFA Youth League semifinals, their best-ever placing in the competition.

2022–present 
Iling-Junior scored his first professional goal on 3 September 2022, in the 13th minute in Trento–Juventus Next Gen, their first season match. He made his Serie A debut for the first team in a match against Empoli, on 21 October, coming on as a substitute for Filip Kostić in the 84th minute.

On 25 October, Iling-Junior made his Champions League debut against Benfica, replacing Kostić in the 70th minute with Juventus trailing 4–1. He assisted Arkadiusz Milik's 4–2 goal after six minutes, and provided a key pass for Weston McKennie's goal two minutes later. Four days later, in an away match against Lecce, Iling-Junior assisted Nicolò Fagioli's winner after only 41 seconds from entering the pitch; however, he suffered a right-ankle sprain after being fouled by Federico Di Francesco, ruling him out for 20 days.

On 19 December, Juventus announced that Iling-Junior renewed his contract until 2025, being subsequently promoted to the first team. He was promoted after scoring four goals in nine matches for Next Gen (two of which were during the previous season). 

International career 
Iling-Junior was a member of the U17's 2019 Syrenka Cup winning squad.

On 6 October 2021, he made his debut for the England U19s as a substitute during a 3–1 defeat to France in Marbella, Spain. On 17 June 2022, Iling-Junior was included in the England U19 squad for the 2022 UEFA European Under-19 Championship, which England won with a 3–1 extra time victory over Israel on 1 July.

On 21 September 2022, he made his England U20 debut in a 3–0 win over Chile at the Pinatar Arena in Spain.

Style of play 
Iling-Junior mainly plays a winger, either on the left or right. His versatility allowed him to be deployed various areas of the pitch by Juventus U19 coach Andrea Bonatti, namely as a left-back, left or right forward, attacking midfielder or central midfielder. His main qualities are his goalscoring, dribbling and running abilities.

Personal life 
Iling-Junior moved to Italy during the COVID-19 pandemic, which he found challenging. He has become nearly fluent in Italian. He trains privately with Saul Isaakson-Hurst, a former Chelsea and Tottenham academy coach.

Career statistics

Club

Honours 
England U19
 UEFA European Under-19 Championship: 2022

Notelist

References

External links 
Profile at the Juventus F.C. website

2003 births
Living people
English footballers
England youth international footballers
Association football wingers
Chelsea F.C. players
Juventus F.C. players
Juventus Next Gen players
Serie A players
Serie C players
English expatriate footballers
English expatriate sportspeople in Italy
Expatriate footballers in Italy
Black British sportspeople
Footballers from Islington (district)